John George Ashley (March 5, 1930 – January 5, 2008) was a Canadian referee in the National Hockey League.

Early life 
Ashley was born in Galt, Ontario, and raised in Preston. He played junior hockey with the Toronto Marlies and Guelph Biltmores. In 1950, he tried out for the Toronto Maple Leafs and played on farm teams in Pittsburgh and Syracuse, New York.

Career 
Ashley started his officiating career in 1959. From 1964 to 1972, John officiated every Game Seven in the Stanley Cup playoffs.

During the 1971 Stanley Cup playoffs, Ashley achieved a first for NHL referees by officiating the seventh game of all three series that went the limit: a quarterfinal (Montreal vs. Boston), a semifinal (New York vs. Chicago), and the final (Montreal vs. Chicago). 

John was elected to the Hockey Hall of Fame in 1981. Ashley was elected to the Cambridge Sports Hall of Fame in 1998.

Personal life 
Ashley died in Kitchener, Ontario, on January 5, 2008.

References

External links 
 

1930 births
2008 deaths
Hockey Hall of Fame inductees
Ice hockey people from Ontario
National Hockey League officials
Sportspeople from Cambridge, Ontario

Toronto Marlies players
Guelph Biltmore Mad Hatters players